Pen Park Hole is a large cavern situated underground, at the edge of Filton Golf Course. The cavern was discovered accidentally in the 17th century and the first descent was made by Captain Sturmy in 1669. The entrance is adjacent to the Southmead and Brentry housing estates of north Bristol. Access is tightly controlled by Bristol City Council. It was scheduled as a Site of Special Scientific Interest in 2016 on account of its geological origins, and its cave invertebrate community including the cave shrimp Niphargus kochianus, which is normally known as a spring seepage or chalk aquifer species.

History
Captain Sturmy descended into the pit on July 2, 1669. Having roped down from an old lead mine, he and a miner companion descended using 25 fathoms of rope. They found a large chamber which they illuminated with candles. Exploring further they found an underground river 20 fathoms wide. Here they found what they thought was a rich mine "an abundance of strange places, the flooring being a kind of a white stone, enamelled with lead-ore, and the pendant rocks were glazed with saltpetre, which distilled upon them from above, and which time had petrified." After a few hours they ascended to the surface, but the unfortunate Captain Sturmy suffered from a severe headache for four days, developed a fever and died. This gave the hole a bad reputation and for a long time, nobody was willing to explore it further.

On 17 March 1775 Reverend Thomas Newnam of Redcliffe Church fell to his death while attempting to plumb the depth when the tree branch onto which he was holding broke. His body was recovered 17 days later.

In 2007 a mast for mobile phone signals was proposed at the site, however a local campaign had this resited. In 2012 a housing development was proposed. This was rejected after further surveys of the cave showing that it was the only subterranean colony of the shrimp Niphargus kochianus.

Description
The cave consists of some short climbs, and a few chambers, the last of which is a very tall rift chamber with a lake that changes height by as much as 20 metres. Side passages contain impressive dogtooth spar. The cave was formed by rising geothermal water (and is one of the best examples of a hydrothermal cave in the UK or Ireland), making it far older than other caves in the area, at around 190 million years old.

The cave entrance is in a residential area and is protected by a steel plate for safety reasons. Access is under the control of Bristol City Council.

References

External links
Pen Park Hole (2013) http://www.penparkhole.org.uk/

UK Caves - Pen Park Hole (2011) http://www.ukcaves.co.uk/cave-penpark

Caves of Bristol
Southmead